The Scout and Guide movement in Zimbabwe is served by
 Girl Guides Association of Zimbabwe, member of the World Association of Girl Guides and Girl Scouts
 The Boy Scouts Association of Zimbabwe, member of the World Organization of the Scout Movement

See also